Hank Crawford's Back is the seventeenth album led by saxophonist Hank Crawford and his sixth for the Kudu label which was released in 1976.

Reception

AllMusic awarded the album 3 stars.

Track listing
 "Funky Pigeon" (David Matthews) – 6:05
 "I Can't Stop Loving You" (Don Gibson) – 3:04
 "You'll Never Find Another Love Like Mine" (Kenny Gamble, Leon Huff) – 6:45
 "Canadian Sunset" (Eddie Heywood, Norman Gimbel) – 6:06
 "Midnight Over Memphis" (John Stubblefield) – 11:30

Personnel 
Hank Crawford – alto saxophone
Fred Wesley – trombone 
Jeremy Steig – flute
Richard Tee – electric piano 
Eric Gale – guitar 
Anthony Jackson (tracks 4 & 5), Gary King (tracks 1–3) – bass
Steve Gadd (tracks 4 & 5), Andy Newmark (tracks 1–3) – drums 
Nicky Marrero – percussion
Frank Floyd, Zachary Sanders, Ray Simpson – vocals
David Matthews – arranger

References 

1976 albums
Hank Crawford albums
Kudu Records albums
Albums produced by Creed Taylor
Albums arranged by David Matthews (keyboardist)